Globidiellum is a genus of parasitic alveolates of the phylum Apicomplexa.

History

This genus was first described in 1909 by Neumann in Arnoglossus grohmanni and the sand goby (Gobius minutus) and was named Globidium. Henry in 1913 also described this genus in the haddock (Melanogrammus aeglefinus). The genus name was amended to Globidiellum by Brumpt in 1913 who noted that the Globidium was already in use

Description

Other than the original descriptions of this genus very little is known about this genus.

References

Apicomplexa genera